Letheobia decorosus, also known as the Cameroon gracile blind snake or Cameroon worm snake, is a species of snake in the family Typhlopidae. It is found in Cameroon and the Central African Republic.

References

decorosus
Snakes of Africa
Reptiles of Cameroon
Reptiles of the Central African Republic
Reptiles described in 1875
Taxa named by Reinhold Wilhelm Buchholz
Taxa named by Wilhelm Peters